The 2011–12 Swiss Super League season was the 115th season of top-tier football in Switzerland. It began on 16 July 2011 and ended on 23 May 2012.

Basel successfully defended their title. No team was directly relegated after Neuchâtel Xamax were expelled midway through the season over severe financial irregularities.

The league comprised the best eight sides from the 2010–11 season, the 2010–11 Swiss Challenge League champions Lausanne-Sport, and Servette, the winners of the relegation/promotion play-off between the ninth-placed Super League team and the Challenge League runners-up.

Since Switzerland dropped from thirteenth to sixteenth place in the UEFA association coefficient rankings at the end of the 2010–11 season, the league lost its second spot for the UEFA Champions League. The league champions will now enter the second qualifying round of the 2012–13 tournament, while the runners-up and third-placed sides will enter the second qualifying round of the 2012–13 UEFA Europa League.

Season events

Teams
FC St. Gallen were relegated after finishing in last place of the table after the 2010–11 season. The club thus completed a two-year tenure in the Super League. St. Gallen were replaced by 2010–11 Challenge League champions FC Lausanne-Sport, who returned to the highest football league of Switzerland after a nine-year absence.

A further spot in the league was contested in a relegation/promotion playoff between ninth-placed AC Bellinzona and Challenge League runners-up Servette FC from Geneva. Both teams played a two-legged series, which was won by Servette, 3–2 on aggregate. The Geneva side thus returned to the Super League after six years, while Bellinzona were relegated to the Challenge League after three years in the highest Swiss football league.

Stadia and locations

League table

Results
All ten clubs played twice against each other during the first half of the season, once at home and once away, for a total of 18 matches. As Neuchâtel Xamax had their license revoked during the winter break, the club's second-half matches were entirely cancelled. The second half of the season thus was competed by only nine clubs, which played another double round-robin schedule; each of these nine clubs hence had played 34 matches at the end of the season.

First half of season

Second half of season

Relegation play-offs
The ninth-placed Super League team played a two-legged play-off against the 2011–12 Challenge League runners-up for a spot in the 2012–13 season.

Sion won 2–1 on aggregate.

Top goalscorers

 Updated 23 May 2012
 Source Swiss Football League

References

External links
 Official website 

 

Swiss
1
Swiss Super League seasons